The 1960 North Carolina gubernatorial election was held on November 8, 1960. Democratic nominee Terry Sanford defeated Republican nominee Robert L. Gavin with 54.45% of the vote.

Background 
By 1960, many of the North Carolina's leading Democratic politicians from the previous two decades were dead. The incumbent governor, Luther H. Hodges did not have a strong political organization and was retiring from politics.

Democratic primary campaign 
John Davis Larkins Jr. was the first Democrat to declare his candidacy, announcing his bid on January 20, 1960.

Primary elections
Primary elections were held on May 28, 1960.

Democratic primary

Candidates
Terry Sanford, former State Senator
I. Beverly Lake Sr., attorney
Malcolm B. Seawell, North Carolina Attorney General 	
John Davis Larkins Jr., former State Senator

Results

General election

Candidates
Terry Sanford, Democratic 
Robert L. Gavin, Republican

Results

References

Works cited 
  - Read online, registration required

1960
North Carolina
Gubernatorial
November 1960 events in the United States